Pimelea linifolia, commonly known as slender rice flower is a common, variable shrub widespread throughout eastern Australia. It has narrow leaves arranged in opposite pairs, and usually white flowers arranged in heads of seven or more on the ends of the stems, with four lance-shaped bracts at the base of the inflorescence. The plant may be toxic to livestock.

Description
They are arranged in heads of between seven and sixty on the ends of the stems, with four, sometimes eight bracts at the base. Some flowers are bisexual and others are female, the female flowers shorter.

Taxonomy and naming
Pimelea linifolia was first formally described in 1793 by James Edward Smith from a specimen that "flowered in the greenhouse of Lord Viscount Lewisham in February 1794". The specific epithet (linifolia) strictly means "thread-like leaf" but is also used for "linear leaf".

Distribution and habitat
Slender rice flower is widespread and common in eastern Australia. It usually grows in wet forest, sometimes on the margin of rainforest. It occurs from north-east Queensland, through the eastern half of New South Wales, all but the far north-west of Victoria, the south-east of South Australia and throughout Tasmania.

Ecology
This plant is suspected of being poisonous to sheep, but the evidence is inconclusive.

Uses
The bark of P. linifolia can be processed into fine strong thread for catching the bogong moth (Agrotis infusa). This string, called a 'Bushman's bootlace', is produced by a traditional method that involves wetting, drying, beating and rolling the material.

References

Malvales of Australia
linifolia
Flora of South Australia
Flora of Queensland
Flora of New South Wales
Flora of the Australian Capital Territory
Flora of Victoria (Australia)
Flora of Tasmania
Taxa named by James Edward Smith
Plants described in 1793